The Taugl or also Tauglbach is a river of the State of Salzburg, Austria.

The river flows from south to north into the lake , which is drained by the Almbach. The river has a length of approx. It is therefore classified as a dangerous white water river. The water quality is classified as A grade.

Rivers of Salzburg (state)
Rivers of Austria